I Dare You is a Canadian children's television program hosted by Daniel Cook that aired between September 4, 2006 and June 13, 2007. Cook dares viewers to participate in three physical exercises. At the end of the program all three movements are combined. The program aims to encourage physical activity, not simply passive viewing. Each episode ends with Cook eating healthy food, such as fruit or milk. The program aired for two seasons.

Episodes

Season 1 (2006)
 March and Hop
 The Plank March
 Thiathlon: Summer
 V Step
 Dice V
 Dice Jumps
 Grapevine
 Chugs
 Knees Up
 Butt Kicks
 The Crab
 Bicycle
 Monkey
 Squish the Grape
 Twist
 Dig for Dinosaurs
 Balance
 Skipping
 Jumping
 Karate Kicks
 Arm Punches
 Rowing
 Basketball
 Clapper
 Goalie
 Funky Chicken

See also
This is Daniel Cook

References

External links
 Picture Box - I Dare You
 Sinking Ship Entertainment - I Dare You
 

2006 Canadian television series debuts
2007 Canadian television series endings
2000s Canadian children's television series
Canadian preschool education television series
Exercise television shows
TVO original programming